Oliver Ortega (born October 2, 1996) is a Dominican professional baseball pitcher in the Minnesota Twins organization. He has previously played in Major League Baseball (MLB) for the Los Angeles Angels.

Professional career

Los Angeles Angels
Ortega signed with the Los Angeles Angels as an international free agent on February 10, 2015. He spent the 2015 season with the DSL Angels, going 1–3 with a 4.33 ERA over  innings. He spent the 2016 season with the AZL Angels, going 2–3 with a 2.83 ERA over  innings. Ortega did not appear in a game in 2017. He spent the 2018 season with the Burlington Bees, going 4–5 with a 3.51 ERA over 82 innings. Ortega split the 2019 season between the Inland Empire 66ers and the Mobile BayBears, going a combined 4–5 with a 3.34 ERA and 121 strikeouts over  innings. Ortega was a 2019 California League All-Star.

Ortega received his first promotion to the major leagues when the Angels selected his contract from Triple-A Salt Lake on September 1, 2021. He made his major league debut on September 8, 2021, tossing 1 1/3 scoreless innings of relief against the San Diego Padres.

On June 26, 2022, Ortega recorded his first major league save, pitching the final two innings of a 2–1 victory over the Seattle Mariners. He was designated for assignment on December 22, 2022.

Minnesota Twins
On January 6, 2023, Ortega was claimed off waivers by the Minnesota Twins. On January 10, Ortega was designated for assignment by Minnesota following the acquisition of A. J. Alexy. On January 17, Ortega cleared waivers and was sent outright to the Triple-A St. Paul Saints.

References

External links

1996 births
Living people
Arizona League Angels players
Burlington Bees players
Dominican Republic expatriate baseball players in the United States
Dominican Summer League Angels players
Inland Empire 66ers of San Bernardino players
Los Angeles Angels players
Major League Baseball pitchers
Major League Baseball players from the Dominican Republic
Mobile BayBears players
People from Nagua
Rocket City Trash Pandas players
Salt Lake Bees players
Tigres del Licey players